Amphilius chalei is a species of catfish in the genus Amphilius. 

The Amphilius chalei, is named after Francis M. M. Chale, a Tanzanian environmental scientist.

It is endemic to Lake Malawi, the Ruhuhu drainage catchment and little Ruaha River. It is a freshwater species and can reach  in length. It was first described by Lothar Seegers in 2008.

References 

chalei
Freshwater fish of Africa
Fish described in 2008